T.V. Kapali Sastry (3 September 1886 in Mylapore – 17 August 1953 in Pondicherry) was an eminent Sanskrit scholar, author, translator and disciple of Sri Aurobindo.

Biography 
Sastry was born in 1886 in a traditional Vedic family at Mylapore, Tamil Nadu. He received his early education at home in Sanskrit under the guidance of his father, who was a Sanskrit scholar at the Oriental Manuscripts Library in Madras. After completing his education, he became a Sanskrit teacher at a High School in Madras.

At the age of twenty he came under the influence of Ganapati Muni, a prominent disciple of Ramana Maharshi and great scholar and poet, who passed on his vast knowledge and learning to Sastry. The latter got deeply immersed in Vedic and Tantric studies and published books and articles in English, Tamil, Telugu and Sanskrit.

After having been a disciple of Ramana Maharshi for some time, he went to Pondicherry in 1929 and became a disciple of Sri Aurobindo and the Mother (Mirra Alfassa). He studied deeply Sri Aurobindo's philosophy and writings, especially his interpretation of the Rig Veda which he explored comprehensively in several books.

Sastry died on 17 August 1953 in Pondicherry.

Further reading 
M. P. Pandit

Works (selection)

English 

 Lights on the Veda
 Sidelights on the Tantra
 Sri Aurobindo: Lights on the Teachings
 The Maharshi
 Gospel of the Gita
 Rig Bhashya Bhumika

Sanskrit 

 Rig Veda Bhashya (Siddhanjana)
 Matr-tattva-Prakasha
 Savitri
 Ahnikastava

Tamil 

 Agni Suktangal
 Sri Aravindar
 Vennira Sudaroli

Telugu 
 Matra Vakkulu

Secondary literature 

 P. Raja (1993), M. P. Pandit. A Peep into his Past. Pondicherry, Dipti Publications, pp. 21–26
 S. Ranade (1997), Madhav Panditji. Pondicherry, Dipti Publications, pp. 10–11
 Kavi Yogi Shri Kapali Sastry, Inaugural Address of Dr. K. Venkatasubramanian, Vice-Chancellor, Pondicherry Central University. In: M.P. Pandit, Sat-Sang, Vol. V, Pondicherry 1987, pp. 156-160

References

Indian Vedic scholars
1886 births
1953 deaths
Sri Aurobindo
20th-century translators